Ein Lämmlein geht und trägt die Schuld, also known by the title of its earliest extant printed libretto, Die leidende und am Creutz sterbende Liebe Jesu, is a Passion oratorio by Gottfried Heinrich Stölzel, composed in 1720. Its opening chorus is based on Paul Gerhardt's "Ein Lämmlein geht und trägt die Schuld" and its usual hymn tune, Wolfgang Dachstein's "An Wasserflüssen Babylon" melody.

The Passion oratorio was performed at least half a dozen times in various German cities during the composer's lifetime, and Johann Sebastian Bach reworked one of its arias to a cantata movement (BWV 200).

History

Gottfried Heinrich Stölzel was already an accomplished composer when he settled in Gotha, where he would remain for the rest of his life, in late 1719. His first large work for that city was a Christmas oratorio consisting of three cantatas, to be performed on three consecutive days in December 1719.

Gotha 1720
In 1720, the libretto of Die leidende und am Creutz sterbende Liebe Jesu was printed in Gotha, where the passion oratorio was performed in two parts, on Maundy Thursday and Good Friday.

Sondershausen 1730s
From 1730, Stölzel provided liturgical music for Sondershausen. The score and parts of Stölzel's performance version of Ein Lämmlein geht und trägt die Schuld, copied in Gotha, survived in Sondershausen, where the Passion oratorio was likely performed more than once in the 1730s.

Leipzig 1734

Johann Sebastian Bach performed the Passion oratorio, under the title Der Gläubigen Seele Geistliche Betrachtungen Ihres leidenden Jesu, on Good Friday in 1734.

1736: Rudolstadt and Nürnberg
Printed librettos of the Passion oratorio appeared in Rudolstadt and Nürnberg in 1736, indicating performances in both cities in that year.

Göttingen 1741
Another printed libretto, published in Göttingen in 1741, mentioning Stölzel as the author of both the libretto and the music, indicates a performance in that city.

Berlin manuscript
A manuscript copy of the score, derived from the Nürnberg version, is preserved in Berlin and indicates a further 18th-century performance of the Passion oratorio.

Music and text
Stölzel's Passion oratorio is structured as a succession of cantata-like  (contemplations). Typical for Stölzel's oratorios, the text of Ein Lämmlein geht und trägt die Schuld is lyrical and meditative, rather than carried by a dramatic narrative, such as a Bible extract. Stölzel is the author of the Passion oratorio's libretto.

The movements are recitatives followed by arias, and several chorales. The opening chorus is a chorale on Paul Gerhardt's "Ein Lämmlein geht und trägt die Schuld" hymn, set, as usual, to the tune of Wolfgang Dachstein's "An Wasserflüssen Babylon", and enriched with figuration by the strings (Str). Near the end is the only other choral movement set to free poetry, and sung by the : "" is the only elaborate chorus.

Soprano (S), alto (A), tenor (T) and bass (B) take turns in performing the text assigned to the : the four voices together form the choir of faithful souls. Obbligato instruments, such as oboe or flute, accompany several arias. The  (Christian Church), that is the  choir, sings the chorales.

Text and/or music of Stölzel's Ein Lämmlein geht und trägt die Schuld can be found in:
 Music manuscript Mus.A15:2 at the Sondershausen city library, which is named after Johann Karl Wezel. Here the Passion oratorio is set "a 11", that is: four voices (SATB), oboe (Ob), flute (Fl), strings (two violin parts and one viola part), and basso continuo (viola da gamba and harpsichord). 
 Music manuscript  at the Berlin State Library. In this version violin (Vn), two flutes (2Fl), corno (Cr) and bassoon (Bs) perform as instrumental soloists.
 Printed libretto of a 1741 performance of Die leidende und am Creutz sterbende Liebe Jesu in Göttingen.

Reception
Johann Sebastian Bach not only performed Stölzel's Passion oratorio in 1734: he reworked one of its arias, "Dein Kreuz, o Bräutigam meiner Seelen", into Bekennen will ich seinen Namen, BWV 200, which he completed in 1742.

In the 21st century Stölzel's Passion oratorio was programmed in public concerts:
 31 March 2018: performed in Cheltenham, by the Corelli Orchestra and Ensemble, conducted by Warwick Cole.
 20 April 2019: performed in Gotha, by the Rheinische Kantorei, conducted by Hermann Max.

References

Sources

External links

 
 

Passion settings
1720 compositions